Angel Chakarov (born 31 August 1950) is a Bulgarian former breaststroke and medley swimmer. He competed at the 1968 Summer Olympics and the 1972 Summer Olympics.

References

External links
 

1950 births
Living people
Bulgarian male breaststroke swimmers
Bulgarian male medley swimmers
Olympic swimmers of Bulgaria
Swimmers at the 1968 Summer Olympics
Swimmers at the 1972 Summer Olympics
Sportspeople from Varna, Bulgaria
20th-century Bulgarian people
21st-century Bulgarian people